The Gegenees (from Greek: Γηγενεής Gēgeneēs; Γηγενής Gēgenēs, "earth-born") were a race of six-armed giants who inhabited the same island as the Doliones in the ancient Greek epic Argonautica. They were also called Gegeines.

Mythology
Jason and the Argonauts landed on an island where the Gegenees resided. The Argonauts fought them and unknowingly left Heracles on the island where he continued to fight them. The Argonauts returned and were able to help Heracles fight them off.

References

Sources 
 Apollonius Rhodius, Argonautica, edited and translated by William H. Race, Loeb Classical Library No. 1, Cambridge, Massachusetts, Harvard University Press, 2009. . Online version at Harvard University Press.

Greek giants
Characters in the Argonautica